Marrying the Game is an American reality television series that aired on VH1 and premiered on November 19, 2012 and ended July 2, 2014.

Premise
Marrying the Game chronicles the life of Jayceon Taylor, mostly known as The Game, and his fiancé Tiffney Cambridge. The couple dated for eight years, have two children together and were preparing to walk down the aisle. The second season follows the couple after Tiffney called off the wedding, moved out of the family home with their kids and as they work to fix their relationship.

Cast

Main
 Jayceon Taylor / The Game, Rapper, record producer, entrepreneur, and actor
 Tiffney Cambridge, Elementary school teacher for 14 years and on/off fiancé to Jayceon

Supporting
 King "Justice" Taylor, Jayceon's and Tiffney's son
 Cali Dream Taylor,  Jayceon's and Tiffney's daughter
 Harlem Caron Taylor, Jayceon's son from previous relationship
 Dontay Kidd, Jayceon's manager and best friend
 Maya Mellon, Tiffney's sister

Episodes

Series overview

Season 1 (2012)

Season 2 (2013)

Season 3 (2014)

References

External links
 
 

2010s American reality television series
2012 American television series debuts
Television series based on singers and musicians
African-American reality television series
English-language television shows
VH1 original programming
Television series by Endemol
Television series by 51 Minds Entertainment
2014 American television series endings